Demographic history is the reconstructed record of human population in the past. Given the lack of population records prior to the 1950s, there are many gaps in our record of demographic history. Historical demographers must make do with estimates, models and extrapolations. For the demographic methodology, see historical demography.

Historical population of the world

Estimating the ancestral population of anatomically modern humans, Colin McEvedy and Richard Jones chose bounds based on gorilla and chimpanzee population densities of 1/km2 and 3-4/km2, respectively, then assumed that as Homo erectus moved up the food chain, they lost an order of magnitude in density. With a habitat of 68 million km2 ("the Old World south of latitude 50° north, minus Australia"), Homo erectus could have numbered around 1.7 million individuals. After being replaced by Homo sapiens and moving into the New World and de-glaciated territory, by 10,000 BC world population was approaching four million people. McEvedy and Jones argue that, after populating the maximum available range, this was the limit of our food-gathering ancestors, with further population growth requiring food-producing activities.

The initial population "upswing" began around 5000 BC. Global population gained 50% in the 5th millennium BC, and 100% each millennium until 1000 BC, reaching 50 million people. After the beginning of the Iron Age, growth rate reached its peak with a doubling time of 500 years. However, growth slackened between 500 BC and 1 AD, before ceasing around 200 AD. This "primary cycle" was, at this time in history, confined to Europe, North Africa, and mainland Asia. McEvedy and Jones describe a secondary, "medieval cycle" being led by feudal Europe and Song China from around 900 AD.

During the period from 500 to 900 world population grew slowly but the growth rate accelerated between 900 and 1300 when the population doubled. During the 14th century, there was a fall in population associated with the Black Death that spread from Asia to Europe. This was followed by a period of restrained growth for 300 years.

John F. Richards estimated the following world populations from the early modern period, 1500–1800.

 1500 world population 400-500 million
 1600 world population 500-600 million
 1700 world population 600-700 million
 1800 world population 850-950 million

In the 18th century world population entered a period of accelerated growth. European population reached a peak growth rate of 10 per thousand per year in the second half of the 19th century. During the 20th century, the growth rate among the European populations fell and was overtaken by a rapid acceleration in the growth rate in other continents, which reached 21 per thousand per year in the last 50 years of the millennium. Between 1900 and 2000, the population of the world increased by 277%, a fourfold increase from 1.5 billion to 6 billion. The European component increased by 124%, and the remainder by 349%.

Asia

India

The Indian population was about 100 million in 1500. Under the Mughal Empire, the population rose to 160 million in 1700 by 1800 the population rose to 185 million. Mughal India had a relatively high degree of urbanization for its time, with 15% of its population living in urban centres, higher than the percentage of the urban population in contemporary Europe at the time and higher than that of British India in the 19th century. Under the British Raj, the population reached 255 million according to the census taken in 1881.

Studies of India's population since 1881 have focused on such topics as total population, birth and death rates, growth rates, geographic distribution, literacy, the rural and urban divide, cities of a million, and the three cities with populations over eight million: Delhi, Greater Mumbai (Bombay), and Kolkata (Calcutta).

Mortality rates fell in 1920-45 era, primarily due to biological immunization. Other factors included rising incomes and better living conditions, improved better nutrition, a safer and cleaner environmental, and better official health policies and medical care.

Severe overcrowding in the cities caused major public health problems, as noted in an official report from 1938:
In the urban and industrial areas ... cramped sites, the high values of land and the necessity for the worker to live in the vicinity of his work ... all tend to intensify congestion and overcrowding. In the busiest centres houses are built close together, eave touching eave, and frequently back to back .... Indeed space is so valuable that, in place of streets and roads, winding lanes provide the only approach to the houses. Neglect of sanitation is often evidenced by heaps of rotting garbage and pools of sewage, whilst the absence of latrines enhance the general pollution of air and soil.

China 

China has older bureaucratic records than any other country. For example, Chinese imperial examinations can be dated back to 165 AD. British Economist Angus Maddison estimated Asia's past populations through detailed analysis of China's bureaucratic records and the country's past gross domestic product.

Population of Asia 1-1820 C.E. (million)

Source: Maddison

In the 15th century, China had approximately 100 million population. During the Ming (1368-1644) and Qing (1644-1911) dynasties, China experienced a high population increase. From the years 1749 to 1811 the population doubled from approximately 177 million to 358 million. Advances in China's agriculture made feeding such a growing population possible. However, by 1815 increased rice prices caused landless households to favor feeding male infants which caused an increase in infant female mortality. Middle class households did the opposite due to their higher economic means and their infant female mortality rate declined. The rising cost of rice additionally affected the adult demographics, adult male mortality rate increased more than the adult female mortality rate.

The growing population of China continued into the 21st century. The country continued to face the strenuous issue of how to feed its ever-growing population. In 1979 extreme reform was put into place with the implementation of China's one-child policy.

Early modern Europe

The population of early modern Europe, circa 1600 is estimated as follows (per Karl Julius Beloch, except for Russia for which Vodarsky's estimate is provided):

Italy: 13,000,000
Spain and Portugal: 10,000,000
France: 16,000,000, in its boundaries in 1600
England and Wales: 4,500,000
Scotland and Ireland: 2,000,000
Netherlands: 3,000,000, including the Spanish Netherlands in 1600
Denmark: 600,000
Sweden, Norway, and Finland: 1,400,000
Poland with Prussia: 3,000,000
Germany: 20,000,000, probably including most or all of the territory of the Holy Roman Empire outside Italy.
Russia: 7,000,000 (the population of the Tsardom of Russia within the 1600 borders)

See also 
Historical demography, Methodology and sources
Classical demography, Ancient world
Medieval demography
Early modern demography
Paleodemography
Prehistoric demography
:Category:Demographic history by country or region

References

Further reading
  Cipolla, Carlo M. The economic history of world population (1974 online free
 Fogel, Robert W. The Escape from Hunger and Premature Death, 1700-2100: Europe, America, and the Third World (2004)
 Fogel, Robert W. Explaining Long-Term Trends in Health and Longevity (2014)
 Lee, Ronald. " The Demographic Transition: Three Centuries of Fundamental Change," Journal of Economic Perspectives (2003) 17#4 pp. 167–190 online
 Livi-Bacci, Massimo. A concise history of world population (Wiley, 2012) excerpt
 McEvedy, Colin. Atlas of World Population History (1978) Basic graphs of total population for every region of the globe from 400 BC to 2000 AD  online free
 Wrigley, E.A. Population and History (1976)

Ancient

 Bagnall, R.S. and Frier, B.W. The Demography of Roman Egypt (1994) Using data on family registers during the first three centuries AD, and modern demographic methods and models. Reconstructs the patterns of mortality, marriage, fertility, and migration.
 Scheidel, Walter, ed. Debating Roman Demography (Brill: Leiden, 2001)
 *Scheidel, Walter. Roman Population Size: The Logic of the Debate, July 2007, Princeton/Stanford Working Papers in Classics

Asia 
 Davis, Kingsley. The Population of India and Pakistan (1951) Snippets
 Dyson, Tim, ed. India's Historical Demography: Studies in Famine, Disease and Society (London: Curzon, 1989)
Mari Bhat, P. N. "Mortality and fertility in India, 1881–1961: a reassessment." in India's Historical Demography  (1989).
 Hanley, Susan B., and Kozo Yamamura. Economic and demographic change in pre-industrial Japan 1600-1868 (1977).
 Krishnan, Parameswara. Glimpses of Indian Historical Demography (Delhi: B.R. Publishing Corporation 2010) 
Lee, James Z. and Feng Wang. One Quarter of Humanity: Malthusian Mythology and Chinese Realities, 1700-2000 (2002); argues China's marital fertility was far below European levels esp, because of infanticide and abortion, as well as lower rates of marriage for men, low rates of marital fertility, and high rates of adoption
 Peng, Xizhe. "China’s demographic history and future challenges." Science 333.6042 (2011): 581–587.
 Taeuber, Irene Barnes. The population of Japan (1958).

Britain 
 Eversley, D. E. C. An Introduction to English Historical Demography (1966)
 Houston, R. A. The Population History of Britain and Ireland 1500-1750 (1995)
 Lindert, Peter H. "English living standards, population growth, and Wrigley-Schofield." Explorations in Economic History 20.2 (1983): 131–155.
 Wrigley, Edward Anthony, and Roger S. Schofield. The population history of England 1541-1871 (Cambridge University Press, 1989)
 Wrigley, E. A. ed. English Population History from Family Reconstitution 1580-1837 (1997)

Western Europe
 Cain, L.P. and DG Paterson. The Children of Eve: Population and Well-being in History (Wiley-Blackwell, 2012) 391 pp.; Covers Europe and North America
 Flinn, Michael W. The European Demographic System, 1500-1820 (1981)
 Glass, David V. and David E.C. Eversley, Population in History: Essays in Historical Demography, London: Edward E. Arnold, 1965
 Henry, Louis. "The population of France in the eighteenth century." Population in History pp 441+
 Herlihy, David. "Population, Plague and Social Change in Rural Pistoia, 1201–1430." Economic History Review (1965) 18#2 pp: 225–244. [www.jstor.org/stable/2592092 in JSTOR], on Italy
 Imhof, Arthur E. "Historical demography as social history: possibilities in Germany." Journal of family history (1977) 2#4 pp: 305–332.
 Kelly, Morgan, and Cormac Ó Gráda. "Living standards and mortality since the middle ages." Economic History Review  (2014) 67#2 pp: 358–381.
 Knodel, John. "Two and a half centuries of demographic history in a Bavarian village." Population studies 24.3 (1970): 353–376. Online
 Livi Bacci, Massimo  et al. Population and Nutrition: An Essay on European Demographic History (Cambridge Studies in Population, Economy and Society in Past Time) (1991).
 Russell, Josiah Cox. "Late ancient and medieval population." Transactions of the American Philosophical Society (1958): 1–152. in JSTOR
 Walter, John W. and Roger Schofield, eds. Famine, Disease and the Social Order in Early Modern Society (1991)

Eastern Europe
 Katus, Kalev. "Demographic trends in Estonia throughout the centuries." Yearbook of Population Research in Finland 28 (1990): 50–66.
 Katus, Kalev, et al. "Fertility Development in the Baltic Countries Since 1990: a Transformation in the Context of Long-term Trends." Finnish Yearbook of Population Research 44 (2009): 7-32.
 Lutz, Wolfgang, and Sergei Scherbov, eds. Demographic Trends and Patterns in the Soviet Union Before 1991 (1993)
 McCarthy, Justin. Population history of the Middle East and the Balkans (Isis Press, 2002)

Latin America 
 Cook, Noble David. Demographic Collapse: Indian Peru, 1520-1620 (Cambridge University Press, 2004)
 Sanchez-Albornoz, Nicolas, and W.A.R. Richardson. Population of Latin America: A History (1974)

Middle East
 Karpat, Kemal H. Ottoman Population, 1830-1914: Demographic and Social Characteristics (1985)
 McCarthy, Justin. Population history of the Middle East and the Balkans (Isis Press, 2002)
 Todorov, Nikolai. "The Historical Demography of the Ottoman Empire: Problems and Tasks." in Dimitrije Djordjević, and Richard B. Spence, eds. Scholar, Patriot, Mentor: Historical Essays in Honor of Dimitrije Djordjevic (1992) pp: 151–171.

North America

 Fogel, Robert W. "Nutrition and the decline in mortality since 1700: Some preliminary findings." in by Stanley L. Engerman and Robert E. Gallman, eds. Long-term factors in American economic growth (U of Chicago Press, 1986) pp 439–556.
 Hacker, J. David. "A census-based count of the Civil War Dead." Civil War History (2011) 57# pp: 307–348. Online
 Haines, Michael R. and Richard H. Steckel.. A Population History of North America (2000)
 Klein, Herbert S. A population history of the United States (Cambridge University Press, 2012) ) excerpt
 Smith, Daniel Scott. "The demographic history of colonial New England." The journal of economic history 32.01 (1972): 165–183. Online
 Smith, Daniel Scott, and Michael S. Hindus. "Premarital pregnancy in America 1640-1971: An overview and interpretation." The journal of interdisciplinary history 5.4 (1975): 537–570. in JSTOR

Comparative
 Lundh, Christer and Satomi Kurosu. Similarity in Difference: Marriage in Europe and Asia, 1700-1900 (2014)

External links 
 http://www.history.ac.uk/makinghistory/themes/demographic_history.html

 
Demography
Population